Apodus is a genus of fungi that was originally placed within the Lasiosphaeriaceae family. In 2020 it was placed within the Neoschizotheciaceae family.

Species
As accepted by Species Fungorum;
Apodus deciduus 
Apodus oryzae

References

External links
Apodus at Index Fungorum

Lasiosphaeriaceae